In mathematics, Picard–Lefschetz theory studies the topology of a complex manifold by looking at the critical points of a holomorphic function on the manifold. It is a complex analog of Morse theory that studies the topology of a real manifold by looking at the critical points of a real function.  extended Picard–Lefschetz theory to varieties over more general fields, and Deligne used this generalization in his proof of the Weil conjectures.

Picard–Lefschetz formula

The Picard–Lefschetz formula describes the monodromy at a critical point.

Suppose that f is a holomorphic map from an (k+1)-dimensional projective complex manifold to the projective line P1.  Also  suppose that all critical points are non-degenerate and lie in different fibers, and have images x1,...,xn in P1. Pick any other point x in P1. The fundamental group π1(P1 – {x1, ..., xn}, x) is generated by loops wi going around the points xi, and to each point xi there is a vanishing cycle in the homology Hk(Yx) of the fiber at x. Note that this is the middle homology since the fibre has complex dimension k, hence real dimension 2k.
The monodromy action of π1(P1 – {x1, ..., xn}, x) on Hk(Yx) is described as follows by the Picard–Lefschetz formula.  (The action of monodromy on other homology groups is trivial.)  The monodromy action of a generator wi of the fundamental group on  ∈ Hk(Yx) is given by

where δi is the vanishing cycle of xi.

Example
Consider the projective family of hyperelliptic curves of genus  defined by

Then, this family has double-point degenerations whenever .

Suppose that  are the -cycles from the -th torus. Then, the Picard-Lefschetz formula reads

if the -th torus contains the vanishing cycle. Otherwise it is the identity map.

See also 

 Lefschetz pencil

References

Algebraic geometry